Friedlander House may refer to:

Abraham J. Friedlander House, Cincinnati, Ohio
Fred Krause House, Hazen, North Dakota, known also as the Joe Friedlander House, NRHP-listed

See also
Leo Friedlander Studio, White Plains, New York, NRHP-listed